The Australian Minister for the Environment and Water is a position which is currently held by Tanya Plibersek in the Albanese ministry since 1 June 2022, following the Australian federal election in 2022.

In the Government of Australia, the minister and assistant minister are responsible for the protection and conservation of the environment; to ensure that Australia benefits from meteorological and related sciences and services; and to see that Australia's interests in Antarctica are advanced. The minister provides direction and oversight of the Department of Agriculture, Water and the Environment (previously the Department of the Environment and Energy, and before that the Department of Sustainability, Environment, Water, Population and Communities) to develop and implement national policy, programs and legislation to protect and conserve Australia's environment and heritage.

Portfolio responsibilities

The minister administers their portfolio through the  Department of Climate Change, Energy, the Environment and Water and its environment component bodies, including:
 Antarctic Animal Ethics Committee
 Antarctic Ethics Committee (Human Experimentation)
 Antarctic Research Assessment Committees (ARACs)
 Antarctic Science Advisory Committee
 Australia-Netherlands Committee on Old Dutch Shipwrecks
 Australian Antarctic Names and Medals Committee
 Australian Heritage Council
 Bureau of Meteorology
 Environment Protection and Heritage Council
 Great Barrier Reef Consultative Committee
 Great Barrier Reef Marine Park Authority
 Great Barrier Reef Ministerial Council
 Great Barrier Reef Structural Adjustment Package Technical Advisory Committee
 Hazardous Waste Technical Group
 Murray-Darling Basin Authority
 National Environment Protection Council
 National Environmental Education Council
 New South Wales World Heritage Properties Ministerial Council
 Office of the Renewable Energy Regulator
 Science Program Management Committee
 State of the Environment Committee 2006
 Stockholm Intergovernmental Forum
 Sydney Harbour Federation Trust
 Tasmanian Wilderness World Heritage Area Ministerial Council
 Threatened Species Scientific Committee
 Wet Tropics Ministerial Council

List of Ministers for the Environment
The following individuals have been appointed as Minister for the Environment, or any precedent titles:

Notes
 Whitlam was one of a two-man ministry consisting of himself and Lance Barnard for two weeks until the full ministry was announced.

List of Ministers for Water
The following individuals have been appointed as Minister for Water, or any precedent titles:

Former ministerial portfolios

List of ministers for sustainable population
The Minister for Sustainable Population was a ministerial portfolio administered through the Department of the Treasury responsible for "planning properly for the infrastructure needs, for the housing needs, for the transport needs, for the regional needs" of the Australian population of the future. Originally entitled the Minister for Population by Prime Minister Kevin Rudd, his successor, Julia Gillard, renamed the portfolio to the Minister for Sustainable Population to reflect her policy changes on the matter of population growth and the need for a sustainable future for Australia, saying the change sends a clear message about the new direction the Government is taking. After the 2010 federal election, the portfolio was subsumed by the Sustainability, Environment, Water, Population and Communities portfolio.

List of minister for cities and the built environment
The following individual has served as the Minister for Cities and the Built Environment.

List of assistant ministers for the environment
The following individual has served as the Assistant Minister for the Environment.

See also 
 Minister for the Environment (Victoria)
 Minister for Environment (Western Australia)
 Minister for Environment and Natural Resources (Northern Territory)
 Minister for Environment and Heritage

References

External links
 

Environment and Water